The 1969 LSU Tigers football team represented Louisiana State University during the 1969 NCAA University Division football season. Despite a 9–1 record, Tigers did not participate in a bowl game after they were shut out of the Cotton Bowl and Sugar Bowl, and refusing overtures from the Bluebonnet, Gator and Peach bowls.

LSU hoped to appear in the Cotton Bowl, because the winner of the Texas-Arkansas game would be ranked no lower than No. 3 in the Associated Press poll, and quite possibly No. 1. However, when Notre Dame voted to participate in bowl games for the first time since 1924, the Cotton snapped up the Irish. The Sugar Bowl, peeved by a perceived snub from a school just 80 miles away, instead chose Ole Miss, which, despite beating LSU 26–23, was only 7–3.

As it turned out, Texas ascended to No. 1 after Ohio State lost 24–12 at Michigan. The Longhorns kept their top ranking by defeating archrivals Texas A&M 49-12 and Arkansas 15–14, then knocking off Notre Dame 21–17 in the Cotton Bowl.

LSU's 20–15 victory over Alabama was its last home win over the Crimson Tide until 2000.

Schedule

Roster

Team players drafted into the NFL

References

LSU
LSU Tigers football seasons
LSU Tigers football